Enicognathus is a genus of South American parrots in the family Psittacidae.

It contains these species:

 
Psittacidae
Taxa named by George Robert Gray
Taxonomy articles created by Polbot